Fontaine is a French topographic surname for someone who lived near a spring or well. It was originally found in northern and central France. Variants of Fontaine include Fountain, La Fontaine, Lafontaine, and de La Fontaine. Notable people with the name include:

People 
Adélard Fontaine (1892–1967), Liberal party member of the Canadian House of Commons
Anne Fontaine, filmmaker.
Anne Fontaine (designer) (born 1971), Paris-based fashion designer
Arturo Fontaine Talavera (born 1952), Chilean writer and political philosopher
Audrey Fontaine (born 1992), a French badminton player
Bertha V. Fontaine (1929–1986), American home economist
Brigitte Fontaine (born 1939), a French singer and musician
Carole R. Fontaine (born 1950), American biblical scholar
Chris Fontaine (born 1981), American professional stock car racing driver
Claudia Fontaine, British backing singer
Cynthia Lee Fontaine, Puerto Rican drag queen
Del Fontaine, Canadian boxer executed for murder
Dick Fontaine, an English documentary filmmaker
Eddie Fontaine, American actor and rockabilly singer
Eva Fontaine (born 1974), a British actress
Fontaine (singer), American singer, songwriter, guitarist and photographer
Francis Fontaine (1845–1901), American poet and novelist
Frank Fontaine, American comedian and singer
Gabriel Fontaine (born 1940), a Canadian politician
Godfrey of Fontaines, medieval philosopher
Henri Fontaine (1924–2020), French Roman Catholic missionary
Hippolyte Fontaine (1833–1910), a French engineer, developer of dinamo
Isaac Fontaine (born 1975), American former professional basketball player
Jacquelynne Fontaine (born 1982), American opera singer, actress, Miss California 2006
James Fontaine (1757–1790), US Major during American Revolutionary War
Jean Fontaine (1936–2021), French writer and theologian
Jean-Marc Fontaine (1944–2019), French mathematician 
Jerry Fontaine, Canadian politician 
Joan Fontaine (1917−2013), British American actress
John Fontaine (1792–1866), the first mayor of Columbus, Georgia, from 1836 to 1837
Joseph-Éloi Fontaine (1865–1930), physician and political figure in Quebec
Juan Andrés Fontaine (born 1954), Chilean Minister for the Economy, Development, and Reconstruction and Minister of Pulbic Works in the 2010s
Just Fontaine (1933–2023), French football player
Justin Fontaine (hockey player) (born 1987), Canadian professional ice hockey player 
Lamar Fontaine (1829–1921), American military veteran, surveyor, poet and author
Phil Fontaine, Aboriginal Canadian leader
Len Fontaine (1948–2019), a Canadian who played professional hockey in the United States
Liam Fontaine, English football player
Lilian Fontaine (1886–1975), British actress 
Louis Fontaine (1882–1960), an American racecar driver
Madeline Fontaine, a French costumer designer
Matthew Fontaine Maury (1806–1873), an American astronomer, US Navy officer, historian
Maurice Fontaine (1919–2015), a French politician
Michel Fontaine (born 1934), a French sports shooter
Nasio Fontaine, reggae artist from the Commonwealth of Dominica
Nicolas Fontaine (born 1970), a Canadian freestyle skier
Nicole Fontaine, French politician
Nora Fontaine Davidson (1836–1929), American schoolteacher, inspired US Memorial Day
Oliver W. Fontaine (born 1900), American architect 
Pamela Fontaine (born 1964), an American Paralympic table tennis player
Paul Fontaine, American painter
Peter Fontaine (1691–1797), English noble clergyman
Pierre Fontaine (composer) (c. 1380–1450), French composer
Pierre-François-Léonard Fontaine, architect
Raymond Fontaine (born 1980), former professional Canadian football linebacker
René Fontaine, Canadian politician
Richard Maury (1882–1950), American naturalized Argentine engineer
Robert Fontaine (born 1980), French chess grandmaster
Scott Fontaine, American journalist and reporter
Serge Fontaine (born 1947), a Canadian politician
Stéphane Fontaine, French cinematographer
Tina Fontaine (1999–2014), Canadian murder victim
William Fontaine (1909–1968), an American philosopher
Yvonne Fontaine (1913–1996), French worker of Special Operations Executive

Characters
Frank Fontaine, a fictional character in the 2007 video game BioShock
Dr. Harlan Fontaine, a fictional character in the 2011 video game L.A. Noire
Vic Fontaine, a fictional, holographic nightclub singer in Star Trek: Deep Space Nine

See also
La Fontaine (surname), including Lafontaine
De la fontaine (disambiguation), including a list of people with the surname
Fontaine (disambiguation)

References